{{DISPLAYTITLE:C6H14}}
The molecular formula C6H14 (molar mass: 86.17 g/mol) may refer to:

 Dimethylbutanes
 2,2-Dimethylbutane
 2,3-Dimethylbutane
 Hexane
 Methylpentanes
 2-Methylpentane
 3-Methylpentane

Molecular formulas